Albert Dehert (18 November 1921 – 8 July 2013) was a Belgian footballer.

Career
Dehert finished top scorer of the Belgian First Division with 27 goals in 1951 while playing for Berchem Sport. He also played 10 matches for the Belgium national team, scoring 3 goals.

References

External links
 

Belgian footballers
Belgium international footballers
Belgian Pro League players
1921 births
2013 deaths
K. Berchem Sport players
Association football forwards